Hernandarias may refer to:

 Hernando Arias de Saavedra, the first South American governor born in the Americas
 Hernandarias District, Alto Paraná department, Paraguay
 Hernandarias Subfluvial Tunnel, joining Santa Fe and Paraná Argentina